Anel Hajrić (born 4 March 1996) is a Bosnian footballer who plays for Rogaška as a forward.

Career

In 2018, Hajrić signed for Radomlje in the Slovenian second division from Maribor, Slovenia's most successful team.

In June 2019, he signed for Lokeren in the Belgian second division. Hajrić left the club after the 2019–20 season as they went bankrupt, and signed for Bosnian top flight club Željezničar in June 2020.

References

External links
Anel Hajrić at Soccerway
Anel Hajrić at NZS 

1996 births
Living people
People from the Municipality of Žalec
Slovenian footballers
Bosnia and Herzegovina footballers
Association football forwards
NK Maribor players
NK Radomlje players
K.S.C. Lokeren Oost-Vlaanderen players
FK Željezničar Sarajevo players
NK Celje players
First Vienna FC players
NK Triglav Kranj players
NK Rogaška players
Slovenian Second League players
Challenger Pro League players
Premier League of Bosnia and Herzegovina players
Slovenian PrvaLiga players
Austrian Regionalliga players
Slovenia youth international footballers
Bosnia and Herzegovina youth international footballers
Bosnia and Herzegovina expatriate footballers
Bosnia and Herzegovina expatriate sportspeople in Belgium
Expatriate footballers in Belgium
Bosnia and Herzegovina expatriate sportspeople in Austria
Expatriate footballers in Austria
Slovenian people of Bosnia and Herzegovina descent